Roger Jean Nsengiyumva is a Rwandan actor, best known for his appearances in films Africa United and Sixteen and television series Informer and You Don’t Know Me.

Early life
Nsengiyumva grew up in Norfolk in the United Kingdom after fleeing from the 1994 Genocide against the Tutsi in Rwanda.  Nsengiyumva was born in Kigali, and lost his father during the Genocide against the Tutsi in 1994.

Filmography

Filmography

Television

References

Rwandan male actors
Expatriate male actors in the United Kingdom
Rwandan emigrants to the United Kingdom
21st-century male actors
Living people
1994 births
English male actors
Actors from Norfolk